Bryan Chevalier (born 16 March 1994) is a Puerto Rican professional boxer, who has held the WBO-NABO featherweight title since 2021.

Professional boxing career
Chevalier made his professional debut against Jean Carlos Molina on 29 March 2014, and won the fight by a first-round knockout. He amassed a 14–0 record during the next five years, before being scheduled to face Luis Lebron for the interim WBO Latino featherweight title. Chevalier won the fight by unanimous decision. Two of the judges scored the fight 100–90 for him, while the third judge awarded him a 97–93 scorecard. Chevalier made the first defense of his newly acquired regional title against Yeison Vargas on 7 December 2019. He won the fight by a third-round knockout.

Chevalier was booked to face Carlos Zambrano on 4 March 2021, following a 15-month absence from the sport. He won the fight by a third-round knockout. Chevalier first knocked Zambrano down in the first round, with a shot to the back of the head which wasn't spotted by the referee. He knocked Zambrano down twice more in the third round, first with a right straight and then with a body shot, which left Zambrano unable to beat the ten count.

Chevalier faced James Wilkins for the vacant WBO-NABO featherweight title on 9 July 2021. The fight was Chevalier's United States debut, as the bout took place at the Banc of California Stadium in Los Angeles. He justified his role as the betting favorite, winning the bout by unanimous decision, with scores of 97–92, 95–94 and 96–93.

Chevalier faced Carlos Padilla on 6 July 2022, following a near year-long absence from the sport. He won the fight by a second-round technical knockout. Chevalier next faced Cesar Juarez for the vacant WBO Intercontinental super featherweight title on 26 October 2022. He won the fight by a seventh-round technical knockout.

Professional boxing record

References

Living people
1994 births
Puerto Rican male boxers
People from Bayamón, Puerto Rico
Super-bantamweight boxers
Featherweight boxers